Anglès is a catalan municipality, in the comarca of Selva, in the province of Girona, Catalonia. It has an area of 16.30 km² and a population of 5,446 people (2008).

Notable people
 Remedios Varo Uranga, (Anglès, 1908 - Mexico City, 1963), Surrealist painter.

Villages
Anglès, 5.005 
Cuc, 23 
La Farga, 6 
Les Mines del Sant Pare, 24 
Pla d'Amont, 102 
Pla d'Avall, 51

References

External links 
 Pàgina web de l'Ajuntament
 Government data pages 

Municipalities in Selva
Populated places in Selva